Ponil Complex Fire was a lightning-caused fire in New Mexico, United States, that started on Monday, June 3, and was fully contained by Monday, June 17, 2002. The fire burned a total area of 92,470 acres, mainly on Philmont. It was the largest wildfire of its time.

The fire wiped out the forest on a large scale. It disrupted the growth and changed the ecosystem of the area. Four fish species were lost due to this fire.

Origin 
The fire occurred during a season of increased wildfire in the southwestern United States. Four lightning strikes ignited it. Severe drought conditions fueled the fire.

Description 

Ponil Complex Fire started in North County, above highway 64 from Dean Canyon area, and reached to the Valle Vidal area. By July 6, the fire had burned 60,000 acres, and there was no estimate of when the fire will be fully contained. It was upgraded to Type I incident. 1,342 firefighters, 13 water-dropping helicopters, 31 engines, 24 dozers, and 12 water tenders were fighting against the fire. By June 11, the fire had burned 85,000 acres of land. It was fully contained on June 17.

The fire burned a total area of 92,470 acres, with 30,000 acres on the Philmont Ranch. 40% of the area within fire's boundary burned at low severity, with 75% survival of the trees. 13% of the area was completely unburned. The total suppression costs went up to $14 million.

Consequences 
The fire caused large-scale flooding, excessive erosion, and downcutting in the Ponil Watershed. It hindered the growth of riparian tree and burned most of the older and mature riparian trees. The fire heavily affected the Bonita Creek, causing increased sedimentation in Ponil Creek. It caused the loss of cottonwoods and willows. The riparian tree canopy reduced due to the burning of riparian vegetation, which caused higher stream temperature.

A meander was formed after the debris from the fire blocked the main channel. Impaired aquatic habitat is another consequence of the fire. Four different species of fish and more than 2000 fish were lost due to this fire. Most of the aquatic life was eliminated in lower drainage as all fish in Greenwood Canyon were killed.

Six rainstorms after the fire exceeded the 100-year precipitation event in the Hayman burn area in the Trail, West, Camp, Horse, Fourmile, and Sixmile Creek basins since the 2002 fire.

References 

2002 fires in the United States
Wildfires in New Mexico
2002 wildfires in the United States